Zangabad (also Romanized as Zangābād; also known as Zangīābād and Zengiabad) is a village in Ozomdel-e Jonubi Rural District, in the Central District of Varzaqan County, East Azerbaijan Province, Iran. At the 2006 census, its population was 421, in 73 families.

References 

Towns and villages in Varzaqan County